Edilpur Copperplate  was found in a char land dug of Edilpur zamindari under Shariatpur District of Bangladesh about 120 miles directly east of Calcutta. Baboo Conoylal Tagore of Tagore zamindari has presented the plate to Asiatic Society of Bengal in 1838, but now it is missing from collection. The plate is made of copper and was sharp in the letters, that the plate could have been long buried in the place where it was found. There was a seal, which is an elaborately executed figure of Siva in copper cast. The character of this inscription is rather less simple than the earlier alphabets of Pala dynasty. It is strictly the Gaur character which has descended the modern written Bengali. It is much to be regretted that when the first a font of Bengali type was prepared, the letters were made after the model of the running hand or written instead of this which may be called the print hand.

History
In Bengal and India Copper plate inscriptions  (tamarashasana), usually record grants of land or lists of royal lineages carrying the royal seal, a profusion of which have been found . These inscriptions were legal documents such as  title-deeds they were etched on a cave or temple wall, were then secreted in a safe place such as within the walls or foundation of a temple, or hidden in stone caches in fields. The earliest authenticated  plates were issued by the Pallava dynasty kings in the 4th century A.D. The use of copper plate inscriptions increased and for several centuries they remained the primary source of legal records. This is the first copperplate record of a grant by the Sena Dynasty.

Importance of Edilpur Copperplate

Edilpur copperplate inscriptions play an important role in the reconstruction of the history of Bengal. An account of the plate was published in the Dacca Review and Epigraphic Indica. The copperplate inscription written Sanskrit and in Gauda character dated 3rd jyaistha of 1136 samval which represents 1079 A.D. The Asiatic Society's proceeding for January 1838, an account of the Edilpur plate describes that 3 villages were given to a Brahman named Iswara Deva Sarma, of the Vatsa tribe, of the villages of Bagule Bettogata and Udyamuna situated between four equally unknown places in Banga, or Bengal in the 3rd year of Keshab Sen. The grant was given with the landlord rights, receives the power of punishing the chandrabhandas or sundarbans, a race that lived in the forest. It records the grant of the land in the village of Leliya in the Kumaratalaka mandala situated in shatata-padamavati-visaya. The copperplate of Kaesava Sana tells that the king Vallal Sena carried away the goddesses of fortune for the enemies on palanquins (Shivaka) supported by staff made of elephant tusk. It also claims that his father Lakhman Sena (1179–1205) erects pillars of victory and sacrificial posts at Benaras and Allahbad and Adon Coast of South Sea. The plate describes the villages with smooth fields growing excellent paddy also noticed about the dancing and music in the ancient Bengal and ladies of that period used to adorn their bodies with blooming flowers. The Edilpur copperplate of Kaesava Sena records that the king made a grant in favor of  Nitipathaka Isvaradeva Sarman for the inscae of the subha-varsha.

See also

Sena dynasty
History of Bengal
History of India
idilpur Union

References

Ancient Bengal
Medieval India
Indian inscriptions
Shariatpur District